is a Japanese former professional boxer. She is a two-weight world champion, having held the WBC female atomweight title from 2008 to 2015; the WBA female atomweight title in 2015; and the WBC female strawweight title in 2017. Koseki has made a record-breaking sixteen consecutive title defenses of her WBC atomweight title.

Career
Koseki was inspired to take up boxing after watching Hiroshi Kawashima on TV. Koseki won the inaugural All-Japan women's amateur championships in 2003, as well as the second edition in 2004. After winning a third national amateur title in 2007, she decided to turn pro as women's boxing was not yet accepted as an Olympic sport.

Koseki won her first three bouts. She went on to challenge Winyu Paradorngym for the inaugural WBC atomweight world title. Winyu won the fight by unanimous decision. In her next fight, Koseki moved up two weight classes to challenge for the WBC light flyweight title, but she lost again by unanimous decision. In August 2008, Koseki rematched Paradorngym, and won the title with a round 2 knockout at Korakuen Hall. In August 2014, Koseki made her fourteenth consecutive defense, beating Denise Castle with a round 8 technical knockout. With the win, Koseki broke Yoko Gushiken's Japanese national record of 13 consecutive successful world title defenses. In October 2015, Koseki beat WBA champion Ayaka Miyao by unanimous decision to make her sixteenth defense and unify titles.

Koseki won the WBC minimumweight title on 17 December 2017, defeating reigning champion Yuko Kuroki by decision.

She retired on the 29 January 2018, at the age of 34.

Professional boxing record

References

External links 
 

1981 births
Living people
Sportspeople from Tokyo
Atomweight boxers
Mini-flyweight boxers
World Boxing Association champions
World Boxing Council champions
Japanese women boxers